Brønderslev railway station ( or Brønderslev Banegård) is a railway station serving the town of Brønderslev in Vendsyssel, Denmark.

The station is located on the Vendsyssel Line from Aalborg to Frederikshavn. It opened in 1871 and was moved to its current location in 1966. The train services are operated by the railway company Nordjyske Jernbaner, which runs frequent regional train services to Aalborg and Frederikshavn.

History 

The station opened in 1871 as the section from Nørresundby to Frederikshavn of the new Vendsyssel Line opened on 16 August 1871. The station building was designed by the architect N.P.C. Holsøe.

On 7 January 1879, at the opening of the Limfjord Railway Bridge, the Vendsyssel line was connected with Aalborg station, the Randers-Aalborg railway line and the rest of the Danish rail network.

In 1966 the station was moved to its current location and the old station was closed and torn down.

Operations 
The train services are operated by the railway company Nordjyske Jernbaner which runs frequent regional train services to Aalborg and Frederikshavn.

See also
 List of railway stations in Denmark

References

Notes

Bibliography

External links

 Banedanmark – government agency responsible for maintenance and traffic control of most of the Danish railway network
 Nordjyske Jernbaner – Danish railway company operating in North Jutland Region
 Danske Jernbaner – website with information on railway history in Denmark
 Nordjyllands Jernbaner – website with information on railway history in North Jutland

Brønderslev
Railway stations in the North Jutland Region
Railway stations opened in 1871
Ole Ejnar Bonding railway stations
Railway stations in Denmark opened in the 19th century